Indira is a 1995 Indian Tamil-language drama film co-written and directed by Suhasini Maniratnam. It features Anu Hasan (cousin of Suhasini) in the title role with Arvind Swamy, Radharavi, Nassar and Ashwini. A. R. Rahman composed the film's score and soundtrack, while Santosh Sivan handled the film's cinematography.

Plot 

The film revolves around a group of villagers from Maranur, India, and their clash with a neighbouring village leader as their community begins to prosper. Soon, money and greed threaten a will for peaceful coexistence between the two rivalling communities. The main theme involves the role of the caste system and how the younger generation strive to overcome it.

Cast 

Anu Hasan as Indira
Arvind Swamy as Thiyagu
Nassar as Sethupathy
Ashwini as Soundaravalli Sethupathi's wife
Radha Ravi as Kotamarayar
Janagaraj as Kanakku Pillai
P. L. Narayana as Rajamanickam
Chandrahasan as Minister
Viji Chandrasekhar as Shanmugam's secret concubine
Pasi Sathya as Villager
T. V. Varadarajan as Government employee
Monica as Younger Indira
Crazy Venkatesh as Nallamuthu
S. Lalitha as Indira's aunt
Sempuli Jagan as Marimuthu
Pravin as Shanmugam
Ravi Shankar as Pichaimuthu
Singapore Manimaran as Villager
Shobana as Pregnant woman
Vishnu Kumaraswami as Younger Thiyagu

Production 
Suhasini offered the title role – Indira, to her cousin Anuradha, daughter of producer Chandrahasan, and the actress has since noted that "it was a heavy subject for a newcomer. But I was moved by the story line and there were occasions when I was overwhelmed with emotion. Not once did I use  glycerine for tearful scenes". V. Priya worked as an assistant director during the making of the film.

Release and reception 
Indira was later dubbed and released in Hindi as Priyanka. The film won two Tamil Nadu State Film Awards, winning Santosh Sivan the award for Best Cinematographer as well as a Special Jury Award for the film itself. The film however remains the only feature film that Suhasini has directed in her career.

R. P. R. of Kalki wrote it is understood that Suhasini has a healthy way of thinking. Whether she changes the fate of Tamil cinema or not, it will be favorable if she is not changed.

Soundtrack 

 Tamil track list

Hindi track list (Released under the title 'Priyanka')

Hariharan sang the song "Thoda Thoda Pyar", the Hindi version of "Thoda Thoda Malarndhadhenna" originally. But S. P. Balasubrahmanyam who sang the original Tamil version was extremely moved by the tune and wanted to sing the Hindi version also.

References

External links 

1990s Tamil-language films
1995 directorial debut films
1995 drama films
1995 films
Films about the caste system in India
Films scored by A. R. Rahman
Indian drama films